The 2004 United States presidential election in Nevada took place on November 2, 2004, and was part of the 2004 United States presidential election. Voters chose five representatives, or electors to the Electoral College, who voted for president and vice president.

Nevada was won by incumbent President George W. Bush with a 2.6% margin of victory. Prior to the election, news organizations who made predictions were split on whether Nevada was a swing state or leaned towards Bush. Kerry won just one county of the state—Clark County, Nevada's most populous county, and home to Las Vegas. Kerry's second-best performance in the state was in Washoe County, Nevada's next-most populated county, which he lost with 47% of the vote. The statewide results were very similar to the nationwide vote, making it the bellwether of the 2004 election. Moreover, Nevada at the time had voted for the winner of every presidential election since 1912, except for 1976. Independent and third-party candidates collectively won 1.7% of the vote; among this group, Ralph Nader received the greatest share, garnering 0.58%. , this is the last time that Nevada was carried by the Republican nominee, the last time Washoe County voted Republican, and the last time Nevada voted to the right of Iowa, Ohio, or Pennsylvania.

Caucuses
 2004 Nevada Democratic caucuses

Campaign

Predictions
There were 12 news organizations who made state-by-state predictions of the election. Here are their last predictions before election day.

Polling
Bush trailed in only one pre-election poll throughout the general election. By the fall, Bush pulled away and reached 50%. However, in the last week, some voters changed their preferences against Bush, resulting in his polling margin falling slightly. An average of the final three polls before Election Day showed Bush leading 49% to 47%.

Fundraising
Bush raised $2,296,762. Kerry raised $793,504.

Advertising and visits
Bush visited the state 3 times, while Kerry visited Nevada 6 times. Both of them visited the same places: Las Vegas and Reno. Almost every week, the candidates combined spent over $1 million in advertising.

Analysis
In 2000, Bush had won Nevada by only 3.54%, despite that it had been Bill Clinton's second-closest win in 1996. He also fell slightly short of an outright majority. Hence, he was thought by many observers to be vulnerable in the state, which had voted Republican for six elections in a row before Bill Clinton.

In the end, Bush improved his vote share to just over a majority, although his margin narrowed to 2.59%, due to Kerry improving over Gore by a greater amount than Bush improved over his own prior performance. In particular, Bush's vote share actually fell slightly in Washoe County, the state's second-largest county and its largest red county in both 2000 and 2004. Washoe County had given the Republican nominee his biggest raw-vote margin in the state in every election from 1944 through 2000 save 1964 (when this distinction went to smaller Douglas County) and the three elections of the 1980s (when it went to larger Clark County). In 2004, the 'Cow County' of Elko County displaced Washoe County as the county giving Bush his biggest raw-vote margin in Nevada.

However, Bush performed strongly in Nevada's Cow Counties (its 14 counties apart from Clark, Washoe, and Carson City), winning over 60% of the vote in Douglas and Lyon Counties, over 70% in Churchill County, and over 75% in Elko County (where he received the highest vote share of any nominee since William Jennings Bryan in 1896). He also did well in Nye County, another of the larger Cow Counties, getting 58.5%, an improvement of 1.8% over four years prior. And he managed to keep Clark County from being a blowout, holding Kerry to a 4.9% margin there. Together with his limiting his backslide in Washoe, this was enough to give Bush another win in the Silver State. As of 2020, this is the last time that either Washoe County or Nevada has voted Republican, although it was close in both 2016 and 2020, while voting to the right of the nation for the first time that year since 2004 also.

Despite winning all but one of state's counties, Bush performed less consistently in Nevada's congressional districts, where he won two of the three—one of them by just a single percentage point.

Despite Bush winning the state, incumbent Senate Minority Whip Harry Reid won reelection.

Results

By county

By congressional district
Bush won 2 of 3 congressional districts.

Electors

Technically speaking, the voters of Nevada cast their ballots for electors: representatives to the Electoral College. Nevada is allocated 5 electors because it has 3 congressional districts and 2 senators. All candidates who appear on the ballot or qualify to receive write-in votes must submit a list of 5 electors, who pledge to vote for their candidate and his or her running mate. Whoever wins the majority of votes in the state is awarded all 5 electoral votes. Their chosen electors then vote for president and vice president. Although electors are pledged to their candidate and running mate, they are not obligated to vote for them. An elector who votes for someone other than his or her candidate is known as a faithless elector.

The electors of each state and the District of Columbia met on December 13, 2004, to cast their votes for president and vice president. The Electoral College itself never meets as one body. Instead, the electors from each state and the District of Columbia met in their respective capitols.

The following were the members of the Electoral College from Nevada. All 5 were voted for Bush/Cheney, to whom they were unanimously pledged:
 Joe Brown
 Milton Schwartz
 John Marvel
 Beverly Willard
 Paul Willis

See also
United States presidential elections in Nevada

References

Nevada
2004
Presidential